Douglas or Doug Young is the name of:

Sir Douglas Young (judge) (1883–1973), British judge and Liberal Party politician
Douglas Young (1900–1972), one half of the British comedy duo Kenway and Young
Douglas Young (classicist) (1913–1973), Scottish poet, scholar, and translator; leader of the Scottish National Party
Douglas Young (solicitor) (born 1948), one of the founders of the British Armed Forces Federation
Douglas Young (cricketer) (1917–1995), English cricketer
Doug Young (politician) (born 1940), Canadian politician
Doug Young (ice hockey) (1908–1990), Canadian ice hockey defenceman
Doug Young (actor) (1919–2018), American voice actor
Doug Young (boxer) (born 1961), British boxer
Doug Young (sculptor) (born 1955), American sculptor
Doug Young (powerlifter) (1964–2005), American powerlifter

See also 
Dougie Young (1933–1991), singer and songwriter
Douglas Y. Yongue (born 1937), North Carolina politician